Jowkar-e Mehdi (also Romanized as Jowkār-e Mehdī; also known as Jokār-e ‘Olyā) is a village in Gughar Rural District, in the Central District of Baft County, Kerman Province, Iran. At the 2006 census, its population was 30, in 8 families.

References 

Populated places in Baft County